Otto Wallburg (21 February 1889 – 29 October 1944) was a German actor and Kabarett performer. He was a prolific film actor during the late silent and early sound era.

Wallburg was born Otto Maximilian Wasserzug in Berlin, the son of a Jewish banker. He drifted into stage acting, but served in the German Army during the First World War and was wounded on the Eastern Front after winning an Iron Cross. From 1926 onwards he worked in the large German film industry, including many productions made by UFA.

When the Nazis came to power in 1933 he left Germany and moved to Austria where he continued to work in film. He later moved to France and then on to the Netherlands. He was arrested following the 1940 German invasion of the Netherlands. He was held for a while at Westerbork transit camp, and later moved to Auschwitz where he was killed.

Selected filmography

 Uneasy Money (1926) - Herr Fischer
 Chaste Susanne (1926) - Charency
 Derby (1926) - Emil Henschke, Fleischwaren en gros
 We'll Meet Again in the Heimat (1926) - Feldwebel Baumann
 Light-Hearted Isabel (1927)
 Heaven on Earth (1927) - Louis Martiny
 Grand Hotel (1927)
 The Transformation of Dr. Bessel (1927) - Ein französischer Sergeant
 The Mistress of the Governor (1927) - Der Zar
 My Friend Harry (1928) - Gen.Dir. Fredy Sanderson
 Love in the Cowshed (1928) - Wenzel, Seifenschneider
 Theatre (1928) - Tenas
 A Modern Casanova (1928)
 The Fourth from the Right (1929)
 The Woman Everyone Loves Is You (1929) - Haucke
 The Crimson Circle (1929) - Marl
 Foolish Happiness (1929)
 The Merry Widower (1929) - Ein Paradegast
 Column X (1929)
 Marriage in Trouble (1929) - Der Standesbeamte
 Foolishness of His Love (1929) - Bürgermeister Boudier
 His Best Friend (1929)
 Trust of Thieves (1929) - Kriminalkommissar Warren
 Men Without Work (1929)
 The Night Belongs to Us (1929) - Vater Bang
 The Widow's Ball (1930) - Teckelmann
 There Is a Woman Who Never Forgets You (1930)
 Heute nacht - eventuell (1930) - Lawyer
 Hocuspocus (1930) - Dr. Schüler
 The Song Is Ended (1930) - Der Baron
 Der Hampelmann (1930) - Clamotte, Direktor des Warenhauses
 Petit officier... Adieu! (1930) - Baron
 Hans in Every Street (1930)
 Her Majesty the Barmaid (1931) - Othmar von Wellingen - Freds Bruder
 Queen of the Night (1931) - Gaston Molneau
 Her Grace Commands (1931)
 Seitensprünge (1931) - Onkel Emil
 That's All That Matters (1931) - Klöppel - ein Maler
 When the Soldiers (1931) - General von Plessow
 The Opera Ball (1931) - von Arnolds - Helgas Vater
 Salto Mortale (1931) - Pressechef
 The Little Escapade (1931) - August Wernecke, Fabrikant
 The Woman They Talk About (1931) - G.Greven
 Bombs on Monte Carlo (1931) - Ministerpräsiden / Minister
 Who Takes Love Seriously? (1931) - Speculator Bruno
 Congress Dances (1931) - Bibikoff, his Adjutant
 Weekend in Paradise (1931)
 Alarm at Midnight (1931) - Karl Matthes
 Der Hochtourist (1931)
 Ronny (1931) - Intendant des Hoftheaters
 Yorck (1931) - Field Marshal Graf Diebitsch-Sabalkanskij
 Distorting at the Resort (1932) - Abeles
 Two Hearts Beat as One (1932)
 The Song of Night (1932) - Pategg
 The Beautiful Adventure (1932) - Valentin le Barroyer
 The Black Hussar (1932) - Gouverneur Darmont
 How Shall I Tell My Husband? (1932) - Hugo Brickner
 Spoiling the Game (1932) - Gottfried Paradies
 Frederica (1932) - Ewiger Student Wagner
 When Love Sets the Fashion (1932) - Philippe Gilbert
 Madame Wants No Children (1933) - Herr Balsam
 The Big Bluff (1933) - Otto Pitt, Generaldirektor
 Marion, That's Not Nice (1933) - Direktor Satorius - Seifenfabrikant
 What Women Dream (1933) - Kleinsilber
 Das häßliche Mädchen (1933) - Direktor Mönckeberg
 Daughter of the Regiment (1933) - Sergeant Bully
 Die kleine Schwindlerin (1933) - Der Bräutigam
 Greetings and Kisses, Veronika (1933) - Max Becker, ein Geschäftsfreund
 Tell Me Who You Are (1933) - Harry Reimers
 Ways to a Good Marriage (1933) - 'Tange Paula', Eheberatung
 Kind, ich freu' mich auf Dein Kommen (1933) - Der Konsul
 The Tsarevich (1933) - Graf Narkyn
 Inge and the Millions (1933) - Conrady, Geschäftsfreund Seemanns
 Konjunkturritter (1934) - Untermeier, Grundstücksspekulant
 Peter (1934) - Mr. Zöllner, garage-owner
 Bretter, die die Welt bedeuten (1934) - Direktor Petermann
 Ball at the Savoy (1935) - Der Verleger Haller
 Everything for the Company (1935) - Emmerich Liebling
 Little Mother (1935) - Max Berkhoff
 Viereinhalb Musketiere (1935) - Bender, pianist
 Heut' ist der schönste Tag in meinem Leben (1935) - Paul Kaspar
 Catherine the Last (1936) - Sixtus Braun, Großindustrieller
 Bubi (1937) - Taxidriver Muck
 Crossroads (1938) - Le médecin allemand (uncredited) (final film role)

References

External links
 
 Otto Wallburg at Virtual History

1889 births
1944 deaths
Jewish German male actors
Kabarettists
German male film actors
German male silent film actors
Male actors from Berlin
20th-century German male actors
Jewish emigrants from Nazi Germany to the Netherlands
German people who died in Auschwitz concentration camp
Recipients of the Iron Cross (1914)
People from the Province of Brandenburg
German male comedians  
German Jews who died in the Holocaust
Jewish military personnel
German people executed in Nazi concentration camps
German Army personnel of World War I